Natsumi Tsunoda  (born 6 August 1992) is a Japanese judoka. She won the gold medal in the women's 48 kg event at the 2021 World Judo Championships held in Budapest, Hungary.

She won a silver medal at the 2017 World Judo Championships in Budapest.

References

External links
 
 

1992 births
Living people
People from Yachiyo, Chiba
Japanese female judoka
Judoka at the 2018 Asian Games
Asian Games gold medalists for Japan
Asian Games medalists in judo
Medalists at the 2018 Asian Games
World judo champions
20th-century Japanese women
21st-century Japanese women